The ninth season of Impractical Jokers premiered on February 4, 2021. Part of the season was filmed before the COVID-19 pandemic suspended operations in March 2020. Filming and production resumed in September and continued as late as December. The aftershow After Party season 4 was postponed, and debuted with "Space Oddity" on April 15, 2021. Following "The Prince and Me" episode, the season resumed on July 8, where cast member Sal Vulcano would be referred to as Prince Herb for the remaining episodes of the season; however, he dropped the moniker in the "Eric André" episode that aired on April 2, 2022. This was the last season to feature Joe Gatto prior to his departure from the show at the beginning of 2022 after 17 episodes into the season. The season's remaining episodes aired starting from June 16, 2022 with various celebrity guest stars that participate in the losing Joker's punishment.

Episodes

Notes

References

External links 
 Impractical Jokers official website at TruTV
 

Impractical Jokers
2021 American television seasons
2022 American television seasons